The Central Australian Rugby Football League (CARFL) is a rugby league football competition located in Alice Springs, Northern Territory. It has been in existence since 1963. It is a not-for profit organisation tasked with governing the growth of rugby league football around Alice Springs. It consists of four clubs competing in multiple age groups and all games are played at ANZAC Oval, Alice Springs.

Former clubs:
 Vikings RLFC

Both United Magpies and Wests Dragons have been members of the CARFL since its foundation in 1963.

See also

NRL Northern Territory
Northern Territory rugby league team
Rugby league in the Northern Territory
Rugby League Competitions in Australia

References

External links

1963 establishments in Australia
Sports leagues established in 1963
Sport in Alice Springs
Rugby league in the Northern Territory
Northern Territory Rugby League